Conus cossignanii is a species of sea snail, a marine gastropod mollusc in the family Conidae, the cone snails, cone shells or cones.

These snails are predatory and venomous. They are capable of "stinging" humans.

Description

Distribution
This species occurs in the Atlantic Ocean off the island of Maio, Cape Verde.

References

 Cossignani T. & Fiadeiro R. (2014). Quattro nuovi coni da Capo Verde. Malacologia Mostra Mondiale. 83: 14-19.

External links
  To World Register of Marine Species
 

cossignanii
Gastropods described in 2014
Gastropods of Cape Verde
Fauna of Maio, Cape Verde